Eastman Cottage is a historic home located at Roslyn in Nassau County, New York.  It was built about 1870 and is a -story picturesque cottage in the tradition of Andrew Jackson Downing and Calvert Vaux.  It is rectangular in plan, with a small gabled kitchen wing and an attached privy or woodshed.  It features board and batten siding and a hip-roofed front porch supported by four columns with scroll-sawn brackets.  It is the only survivor of three similar cottages at this location.

It was listed on the National Register of Historic Places in 1986.

References

Roslyn, New York
Houses on the National Register of Historic Places in New York (state)
Houses completed in 1870
Houses in Nassau County, New York
National Register of Historic Places in Nassau County, New York